The 2021 season is the 112th in the history of the South Sydney Rabbitohs. Coached by Wayne Bennett and captained by Adam Reynolds, they compete in the National Rugby League's 2021 Telstra Premiership.

Standings

Fixtures

Regular season

Finals Series

Squad movement

Players

Gains

Losses

Re-signings

Coaching staff

Pre-Season

References

South Sydney Rabbitohs seasons
South Sydney Rabbitohs